Unlike the other legislatures of the Fifth French Republic, the eighth legislature from 1986 to 1988 had proportional representation by department.

This table summarises representatives from Aisne in the 7th, 8th and 9th legislatures.

References

 Aisne